Zwischenspiel – Alles für den Herrn ( "Interlude – Everything for the Lord") is the second studio album by German singer Xavier Naidoo, released on his Naidoo Records label on 25 March 2002 in German-speaking Europe. In 2016, it was awarded a double platinum certification from the Independent Music Companies Association, which indicated sales of at least 800,000 copies+ throughout Europe.

Track listing

Charts

Weekly charts

Year-end charts

Certifications and sales

Release history

References

External links
 

2002 albums
Xavier Naidoo albums